Leonardo Gabriel Ruíz Serpa (born 9 December 2000) is a Peruvian footballer who plays as a forward for Brazilian club União Mogi.

Club career

Sport Boys
After a good season as topscorer for Sport Boys' reserve team with 10 goals in the 2019 season, he was promoted to the first team squad in January 2020. He got his official debut for Sport Boys on 15 February 2020 against Carlos A. Mannucci. Ruíz started on the bench, before replacing Eduardo Uribe in the 68th minute. He left the club at the end of 2020.

Brazil
In the beginning of 2022, Ruíz played for Brazilian club Vilavelhense. In April 2022, he moved to fellow country club, União Mogi.

References

External links
 
 

Living people
2000 births
Peruvian footballers
Peruvian expatriate footballers
Association football forwards
People from Lima
Peruvian Primera División players
Sport Boys footballers
Peruvian expatriate sportspeople in Brazil
Expatriate footballers in Brazil